The 2018 Japan Women's Open was a women's tennis tournament played on outdoor hard courts. It was the tenth edition of the Japan Women's Open, and part of the WTA International tournaments of the 2018 WTA Tour. It was held at the Regional Park Tennis Stadium in Hiroshima, Japan, from September 10 through September 16, 2018. This is the first year that the tournament was held in Hiroshima.

Point distribution

Prize money

1 Qualifiers prize money is also the Round of 32 prize money
2 Per team

Singles main-draw entrants

Seeds

 Rankings are as of August 27, 2018

Other entrants
The following players received wildcards into the singles main draw:
  Misaki Doi 
  Nao Hibino 
  Miyu Kato

The following player entered the singles main draw with a protected ranking: 
  Mandy Minella

The following players received entry from the qualifying draw:
  Amanda Anisimova
  Priscilla Hon
  Arina Rodionova 
  Zhang Yuxuan

Withdrawals
Before the tournament
  Ana Bogdan → replaced by  Fiona Ferro
  Jennifer Brady → replaced by  Jana Fett
  Aliaksandra Sasnovich → replaced by  Duan Yingying
  Stefanie Vögele → replaced by  Magdalena Fręch

Retirements
  Yulia Putintseva (lower back injury)

Doubles main-draw entrants

Seeds

1 Rankings are as of August 27, 2018

Other entrants
The following pairs received wildcards into the doubles main draw:
  Miharu Imanishi /  Alicja Rosolska 
  Hiroko Kuwata /  Chihiro Muramatsu

Withdrawals
During the tournament
  Priscilla Hon (gastrointestinal illness)

Champions

Singles

  Hsieh Su-wei def.  Amanda Anisimova 6–2, 6–2

Doubles

  Eri Hozumi /  Zhang Shuai def.  Miyu Kato /  Makoto Ninomiya 6–2, 6–4

References

External links

 
Japan Women's Open
Japan Women's Open
Japan Women's Open
Japan Women's Open